The streak-throated hermit (Phaethornis rupurumii), also known as the Rupurumi hermit, is a species of hummingbird in the family Trochilidae. It is found in Brazil, Colombia, Guyana, and Venezuela.

Taxonomy and systematics

The streak-throated hermit was for a time considered a subspecies of the dusky-throated hermit (P. squalidus). It has two subspecies, the nominate P. r. rupurumii and P. r. amazonicus. They are geographically separated and the latter might be a full species.

Description

It is generally brownish with a greenish back and brownish gray underparts. It has a black "mask" and white supercilium and malar stripe and a very dark brown throat that appears streaky. The sexes are generally alike.

Distribution and habitat

The nominate subspecies of streak-throated hermit is found from the extreme eastern part of Colombia's Vichada Department through central and eastern Venezuela and western Guyana into northern Brazil's Roraima state. P. r. amazonicus is found in north-central Brazil along the Amazon River east of the Negro River. The species inhabits the understory at the edges of rainforest and the interior of várzea forest. It also inhabits drier and more open landscapes such as semi-deciduous and gallery forest, scrublands, river islands, and secondary forest.

Behavior

Movement

The streak-throated hermit is believed to be sedentary.

Feeding

The streak-throated hermit feeds on nectar and also on small arthropods, but details of its diet and foraging technique have not been published.

Breeding

The streak-throated hermit's breeding phenology has not been documented.

Vocalization

The streak-throated hermit's song is "an incessant 'tsi tsi jéb dé tsi tsi jéb dé' or 'eesee-eesee-eesee, eesee-eesee-eesee-swur'", typically sung from a perch near the ground.

Status

The IUCN has assessed the streak-throated hermit as being of Least Concern, though its population size and trend are not known. It is very poorly known but appears to be locally common.

References

streak-throated hermit
Hummingbird species of South America
Birds of the Amazon Basin
Birds of the Guianas
Birds of the Venezuelan Amazon
streak-throated hermit
streak-throated hermit
Taxonomy articles created by Polbot